Juan Michael Language (born 19 April 1989 in Port Elizabeth, South Africa) is a South African rugby union player who last played for the . He can play as a flanker or a number eight.

Career

Youth, club and varsity rugby

He played high school rugby for Hoërskool Framesby in his hometown of Port Elizabeth. In 2007, he was selected to represent an Eastern Province Under-18 side at the Academy Week tournament.

While at Framesby, Language also played sevens rugby. In January 2007, he took part in a high school sevens tournament involving schools from across the Eastern Cape and from Gauteng. He helped Framesby win the competition and was also named Player of the Tournament.

He moved to Durban, where he joined the  academy. In 2010, he played for the  side in the 2010 Under-21 Provincial Competition, making three appearances off the bench.

Between 2011 and 2013, he played club rugby for Durban-based club side College Rovers. In 2012, College Rovers won the KwaZulu-Natal Rugby Union's premier club competition, the Moor Cup, which meant they qualified to the inaugural SARU Community Cup competition in 2013. Language was a regular starter for College Rovers in the competition, playing in all four matches during the pool stages, in their quarter-final match against Durbanville-Bellville and, after sitting out the semi-final, he started in the Final of the competition against Eastern Cape side Despatch. College Rovers fell just short in the final, losing the match 26–24 with Language playing the full 80 minutes.

Language was among a number of players that followed Du Preez to North West Province. He featured prominently for  during the 2014 Varsity Cup tournament, starting seven of their nine matches during the competition as they reached the final of the competition for only the second time.

Leopards

Language's performances during the 2014 Varsity Cup led to his inclusion in the  squad for the 2014 Currie Cup qualification competition. Despite no first class appearances to his name, he was also named vice-captain for the competition.

He had an immediate and significant impact in the match and scored two tries either side of half-time to help the Leopards to a 51–23 victory.

He was the captain of the  team that won the 2015 Currie Cup First Division. He featured in a total of thirteen matches during the 2015 Currie Cup qualification rounds and First Division proper and scored seven tries for the side to be the top try scorer during the second round of fixtures.

References

South African rugby union players
Living people
1989 births
Rugby union players from Port Elizabeth
Rugby union flankers
Rugby union number eights
Leopards (rugby union) players